Kinyongia vosseleri, also known commonly as the Usambara two-horned chameleon and Vosseler's blade-horned chameleon, is an endangered species of lizard in the family Chamaeleonidae. The species is endemic to Tanzania.

Etymology
The specific name, vosseleri, is in honor of German zoologist Julius Vosseler.

Geographic range and habitat

Taxonomy
K. vosseleri  was formerly included in K. fischeri, which is not found in the range of K. vosseleri.

References

Further reading
Nieden F (1913). "Chamaeleon fischeri Rchw. und seine Unterarten ". Sitzungsberichte der Gesellschaft Naturforschender Freunde zu Berlin 1913 (4): 231–249 + Plates XIV–XVI. (Chamaeleon fischeri vosseleri, new subspecies, pp. 247–248 + Plate XV, figure 5, male; Plate XVI, figure 9, female). (in German).
Spawls, Stephen; Howell. Kim; Hinkel, Harald; Menegon, Michele (2018). Field Guide to East African Reptiles, Second Edition. London: Bloomsbury Natural History. 624 pp. . (Kinyongia vosseleri, p. 278).
Tilbury, Colin (2010). Chameleons of Africa, an Atlas, including the chameleons of Europe, the Middle East and Asia. Frankfurt am Main: Edition Chimaira / Serpents Tale. 831 pp. . (Kinyongia vosseleri, p. 418).

Kinyongia
Reptiles of Tanzania
Endemic fauna of Tanzania
Reptiles described in 1913
Taxa named by Fritz Nieden